Damien Thomas (born 1942 or 1943) is a British actor noted for his roles in British films and television, such as his role as Father Martin Alvito in the 1980 hit miniseries Shōgun and as Richard Mason in the 1983 BBC production of Jane Eyre.

Film credits include Journey into Darkness (1968), Julius Caesar (1970), Twins of Evil (1971), Henry VIII and His Six Wives (1972), Tiffany Jones (1973), The Message (1976), Sinbad and the Eye of the Tiger (1977), Pirates (1986), Never Let Me Go (2010) and Grave Tales (2011).

TV credits include: Jason King, Van der Valk, Special Branch, Warship, Wilde Alliance, The Professionals, A.D., Noble House, Blake's 7, Beau Geste, Tenko, Widows, Dempsey and Makepeace, Wish Me Luck, House of Cards, Doctors, The Brittas Empire, Sherlock Holmes, and Agatha Christie's Poirot ("Murder on the Links").

References

External links
 

1943 births
British male film actors
British male television actors
Living people
20th-century British male actors
21st-century British male actors
British people of Egyptian descent